Paignton Zoo is a zoo in Paignton, Devon, England. The zoo is part of South West Environmental Parks Ltd which is owned by the charity Wild Planet Trust, formerly known as the Whitley Wildlife Conservation Trust. The charity also runs Newquay Zoo in Newquay, Cornwall, and ran Living Coasts in Torquay, Devon until its closure in 2020. 

The zoo is a registered educational and scientific charity that has a collection of about 2,000 animals representing nearly 300 species, and it also cultivates about 1,600 different species of plant. It currently employs over 100 permanent staff and an additional 120 seasonally.

Animals
The zoo has a large collection of animals (mammals, birds, reptiles and amphibians) across many different, naturally-themed exhibits.

Mammals
African lion
African pygmy goat
Azara's agouti
Black howler
Black rhinoceros
Bornean orangutan
Brazilian guinea pig
Brown spider monkey
Celebes crested macaque
Cheetah
Cherry-crowned mangabey
Collared peccary
Common dwarf mongoose
Common squirrel monkey
Cotton-top tamarin
Diana monkey
Eastern bongo
Emperor tamarin
Goeldi's marmoset
Hamadryas baboon
Hartmann's mountain zebra
King colobus
Kirk's dik-dik
Lar gibbon
Mandrill
Maned wolf
Meerkat
Mishmi takin
Ouessant sheep
Pied tamarin
Pileated gibbon
Pygmy marmoset
Pygmy slow loris
Red-fronted lemur
Red panda
Red river hog
Red ruffed lemur
Ring-tailed lemur
Rothschild's giraffe
Short-beaked echidna
South American tapir
Southern three-banded armadillo
Sumatran tiger
Swamp wallaby
Western grey kangaroo
Western lowland gorilla

Birds
Black hornbill
Bourke's parrot
Brown eared pheasant
Budgerigar
Chilean flamingo
Eclectus parrot
Edwards's pheasant
Emu
Great argus
Greater roadrunner
Grey crowned crane
Hamerkop
Marabou stork
Nene
North Island brown kiwi
Oriental stork
Pink pigeon
Princess parrot
Red-crowned crane
Red-necked ostrich
Roseate spoonbill
Scarlet ibis
Secretarybird
Socorro dove
Southern cassowary
Southern screamer
Spectacled owl
Sumatran laughingthrush
Toco toucan
Wattled crane
White-faced whistling duck
Wrinkled hornbill

Herps
Aldabra giant tortoise
Annam leaf turtle
Blue tree monitor
Boyd's forest dragon
Chinese crocodile lizard
Common flat-tail gecko
Cuban crocodile
Emerald tree boa
False gharial
Fea's tree frog
Komodo dragon
Lesser Antillean iguana
Mangrove monitor
Nguru pygmy chameleon
Northern caiman lizard
Red-eyed tree frog
Red-footed tortoise
Red-tailed ratsnake
Reticulated python
Saltwater crocodile
Solomon Islands skink
Yellow-banded poison dart frog
Yellow-headed water monitor

History
Paignton Zoo was one of the earliest combined zoological and botanical gardens in Britain and the first that was opened with education as its mission. It was founded by Herbert Whitley, initially as his private collection. Whitley was an early conservationist and a contemporary of people such as Sir Peter Scott and Jean Delacour, the French ornithologist. Paignton Zoo first opened to the public in 1923. After various name changes, it became Paignton Zoo Environmental Park in 1996.

A five-year redevelopment programme, funded by the European Regional Development Fund, refurbished large parts of the zoo and was completed in 2001. A new 10-year plan is now in place to redevelop the remaining areas to ensure that all animals are housed in modern enclosures of the highest standard.

Timeline

1923 – Paignton Zoo opened to the public
1940 – Miniature railway opened
1955 – Herbert Whitley died
1995 – European Regional Development Fund grant started redevelopment of Zoo
1996 – Became Paignton Zoo Environmental Park 
1998 – Zoo Keepers BBC TV documentary series broadcast
2004 – Zoo Story ITV TV documentary series broadcast
2005 – Monkey Heights, the state-of-the-art monkey exhibit, opened
2008 – Crocodile Swamp exhibit opened
2012 – Dr David Stradling, chairman of WWCT, died; the zoo became the first in the UK to witness a giant Titan arum bloom
2013 – In the Great Gorilla Project, life-sized gorillas were placed across Devon for charity and £100,000 was raised
2016 – Great Big Rhino Project raised £123,000 for conservation
2019 – The Whitley Wildlife Conservation Trust is re-named and re-branded as the Wild Planet Trust
2019 – Duchess, the zoo's only African Elephant, died
2020 - Miniature railway closed

Conservation
Paignton Zoo is a member of the British & Irish Association of Zoos and Aquariums (BIAZA), the European Association of Zoos and Aquaria (EAZA) and the World Association of Zoos and Aquariums (WAZA). Its gardens are members of PLANTNETWORK, Plant Heritage and Botanic Gardens Conservation International (BGCI). It works with partner zoos and gardens in these organisations on the management of captive breeding and plant conservation programmes for endangered species.

Education and research
The zoo has a large education team which teaches approximately 40,000 students each year from under-5s to post-16s, as well as adult community groups.

The Education Department was founded in 1961 and the Paignton Zoo Science Department was established in 1997, during the redevelopment programme. Now renamed the Field Conservation and Research Department, it has grown to become a well-known zoo science departments in Europe, with staff engaged in a programme of projects within the zoo, at Wild Planet Trust's other sites in the UK, and at various sites overseas. Projects are carried out at 'A' level, undergraduate and post graduate level.

Botanical gardens

Garden themes and plant collections include a broad collection of temperate hardy trees, shrubs and herbaceous plants arranged by habitat type. The indoor growing areas allow the zoo to grow plants from all over the world, ranging from small critically endangered cactus in the desert house, through to the massive Titan arum, giant bamboo and giant water lilies located in the tropical houses.

Awards
Paignton Zoo was, based on visitor feedback, named by TripAdvisor as the third best zoo in the UK (behind Chester and Colchester) and ninth best zoo in Europe in 2014.

CBBC's The Zoo

In 2017, children's television channel CBBC, in partnership with DHX Media, announced that an episodic comedy show filmed at Paignton Zoo, England, from the point of view of animals, would air in the summer of the same year.

References

External links

The Great Big Rhinos Project
The Great Gorillas Project

Paignton
Zoos in England
Tourist attractions in Devon
Zoos established in 1923
1923 establishments in England
10¼ in gauge railways in England